The 2016–17 UTEP Miners women's basketball team represents the University of Texas at El Paso during the 2016–17 NCAA Division I women's basketball season. The Lady Miners, led by sixteenth year head coach Keitha Adams, play their home games at Don Haskins Center and were members of Conference USA. They finished the season 8–23, 5–13 for in C-USA play to finish in a tie for eleventh place. They lost in the first round of the C-USA women's tournament to Old Dominion.

Roster

Schedule

|-
!colspan="9" style="background:#FF7F00; color:#000080;"| Exhibition

|-
!colspan="9" style="background:#FF7F00; color:#000080;"| Non-conference regular season

|-
!colspan="9" style="background:#FF7F00; color:#000080;"| Conference USA regular season

|-
!colspan="9" style="background:#FF7F00; color:#000080;"| C-USA Women's tournament

Rankings

See also
2016–17 UTEP Miners basketball team

References

UTEP Miners women's basketball seasons
UTEP